An Aqua Velva is a cocktail made with vodka, gin, lemon-lime, and blue curaçao. The curaçao gives the drink the color of Ice Blue Aqua Velva aftershave, which was advertised with the slogan that it "gives your skin a drink."

In the 2007 film Zodiac, the cocktail is depicted as author Robert Graysmith's favored drink. The cocktail's origins prior to the film are uncertain.

See also
Blue Lagoon (cocktail)

References

External links 
 GroupRecipes
 Houstonist Bartender
 cocktailmaking.co.uk

Cocktails with vodka
Cocktails with gin
Cocktails with triple sec or curaçao
Citrus cocktails